Bhutanitis is a genus of swallowtail butterflies that contains four species.

Distribution
The genus reaches its peak diversity in south-western China, particularly Yunnan and Sichuan (Chou, 2000), and adjacent Bhutan. Bhutanitis lidderdali is the most widespread species, occurring in China, Bhutan, India and Myanmmar (Chou, 2000); it is however locally extinct in Thailand due to habitat destruction. Larval host plants known to date are all Aristolochiaceae.

All Bhutanitis species are listed on CITES Appendix II, which restricts their international trade. Historically, they have been highly desired by butterfly collectors; three species in particular (B. mansfieldi, B. ludlowi and B. thaidina) were known from very few specimens until comparatively recently. However, large numbers of specimens of B. thaidina and B. mansfieldi pulchristriata have recently been available at very low prices, mainly from China, which indicates collector demand may be becoming satisfied.

Taxonomy
Two other taxa named as species of Bhutanitis (B. nigrilima Chou, 1992, B. yulongensis Chou, 1992) have since been synonymised with B. thaidina (Hauser et al. 2005). Another taxon, originally named as B. mansfieldi pulchristriata Saigusa and Lee, 1982, was also regarded as a separate species by Chou (1994) and Chou (2000), but has otherwise been regarded as a subspecies (Hauser et al., 2005).

Species

References
 
 Sorimachi, Y. 1994 Geographical and individual variations of Bhutanitis thaidina Apollo, 3: 77-87.(in Japanese).
 Hauser, CL., de Jong, R., Lamas, G., Robbins, R.K., Smith, C., and Vane-Wright, R.I. (2005). Papilionidae – revised GloBIS/GART species checklist (2nd draft). Available online at:  . Verified online 5 March 2010.

External links

 TOLweb.org: Overview, taxonomic discussion, photographs of Bhutanitis

 
Butterflies of Asia
Insects of Bhutan
Butterfly genera
Papilionidae
Taxa named by William Stephen Atkinson